Jimmy Clanton (born September 2, 1938) is an American singer who became known as the "swamp pop R&B teenage idol". His band recorded a hit song "Just a Dream" which Clanton had written in 1958 for the Ace Records label. It reached number four on the Billboard chart and sold a million copies. Clanton performed on Dick Clark's American Bandstand and toured with popular artists like Fats Domino, Jerry Lee Lewis and the Platters.

History
Clanton formed his first band called the Rockets in 1956 while attending Baton Rouge High School.

One of the few white singers to come out of the New Orleans R&B/rock & roll sound, he rode the crest of the popular teen-music wave in the 1950s and 1960s. His records charted in the U.S. Top 40 seven times (all released on Ace); his Top 10 records were: the song "Just a Dream," (Pop #4, R&B #1 in August 1958, credited to 'Jimmy Clanton and His Rockets'), "Go, Jimmy, Go" (peaked at number five in early 1960) and "Venus in Blue Jeans" (peaked at number seven on October 6, 1962, written by Howard Greenfield and Jack Keller).  In early 1961, Clanton was drafted and spent the next two years in the U.S. Army, continuing to have chart successes with "Don't Look at Me", "Because I Do", and the aforementioned "Venus in Blue Jeans".  His only hit in the UK Singles Chart was "Another Sleepless Night", a Greenfield/Neil Sedaka composition that spent one week at number 50 in July 1960.

Clanton starred in a rock and roll movie produced by Alan Freed called Go, Johnny, Go! and later starred in Teenage Millionaire, with music arranged and produced by Dr. John and arranger/trumpeter Charlie Miller. During the late 1950s and early 1960s, Clanton was managed by Cosimo Matassa, the New Orleans recording studio owner and engineer. In May 1960, Ace Records announced in Billboard that Philadelphia had proclaimed the week of May 16 to be "Jimmy Clanton Week."

In 1963, American Bandstand signed Clanton to Dick Clark's Caravan of Stars national U.S. tour which was scheduled to perform its 15th show on the night of November 22, 1963, at the Memorial Auditorium in Dallas, Texas, until suddenly the Friday-evening event had to be canceled moments after U.S. President John F. Kennedy was assassinated that afternoon while touring Dallas in an open-car caravan.

Clanton became a disc jockey at WHEX in Columbia, Pennsylvania, between 1972 and 1976 and performed in an oldies revue also in the 1970s, The Masters of Rock 'n' Roll, with Troy Shondell, Ray Peterson, and Ronnie Dove.  He had a religious conversion in August 1980.  In the 1995 Jazz Fest in New Orleans, Clanton performed with Ray Charles, Chuck Berry, and Frankie Ford.

Clanton was inducted into the Museum of the Gulf Coast Hall of Fame, which also has inducted such performers as Tex Ritter, Janis Joplin, ZZ Top and B. J. Thomas.

On April 14, 2007, at a "Legends of Louisiana Celebration & Inductions" concert in Mandeville, Louisiana, Jimmy Clanton was inducted into the Louisiana Music Hall of Fame.

Clanton married Roxanne Faye Edtmiller on December 8, 1962, and they have three children.

Awards
Clanton's songs "Just a Dream," "A Letter to an Angel," "Ship on a Stormy Sea," and "Venus in Blue Jeans," each sold over one million copies, and were awarded gold discs.

Singles

 AAlso peaked at #50 in UK Singles Chart
 BAlso peaked at #90 in Canadian RPM Top Tracks

References

External links
 Official website
  Jimmy Clanton - More Than the Applause - MyBestYears.com INTERVIEW SPOTLIGHT
 

Musicians from Baton Rouge, Louisiana
1938 births
Songwriters from Louisiana
American rhythm and blues musicians
American male singers
Living people
Swamp pop music
Ace Records (United States) artists
Baton Rouge Magnet High School alumni
Singers from Louisiana
People from Raceland, Louisiana
American male songwriters